The longest word in the Romanian language is , the long name of  (silicosis). It consists of 44 letters and refers to a chronic respiratory disease. Its name in the English language is pneumonoultramicroscopicsilicovolcanoconiosis and it is the longest English word registered on a major English dictionary. Nevertheless, neither this word nor several subsequent Romanian longest words are recognized by the Dicționarul explicativ al limbii române ("Explanatory Dictionary of the Romanian Language", DEX).

The list of the longest Romanian words is the following:

  − 44 letters, the silicosis disease, not admitted by the DEX.
  − 36 letters, an enzyme, not admitted by the DEX.
  − 32 letters, a type of neuritis, not admitted by the DEX.
  − 31 letters, a kind of surgical operation, not admitted by the DEX.
  − 30 letters, a chemical substance, not admitted by the DEX.
  − 25 letters, a medical stabilization method, admitted by the DEX.

The following longest Romanian words are mostly made up of words with 23 or 21 letters.

There are also other Romanian words that break other records within the language. Both are registered in the DEX.

See also
 Longest words
 Longest word in English
 Longest word in French
 Longest word in Spanish
 Longest word in Turkish

References

Romanian words and phrases
Word in Romanian
Romanian